Arthur Earl "Dutch" Wilson (December 11, 1885 – June 12, 1960) was an American professional baseball player. He played all or part of fourteen seasons in Major League Baseball, primarily as a catcher.

Wilson spent most of his career as a backup, although he was the starting catcher for the Federal League's Chicago Whales during their two-season tenure in 1914–1915. He hit the first home run in the history of Wrigley Field, off of George "Chief" Johnson on April 23, 1914. He was the catcher for Cubs pitcher Hippo Vaughn during the "double no-hitter" game in 1917. The Cubs lost the game when Larry Kopf singled, then went to third on an error by Cy Williams and scored on an infield hit by Jim Thorpe in the 10th inning.

In 812 games over 14 seasons, Wilson posted a .261 batting average (536-for-2056) with 237 runs, 24 home runs and 227 RBI. He finished his career with a .972 fielding percentage.

Sources

References

External links

Major League Baseball catchers
New York Giants (NL) players
Chicago Whales players
Pittsburgh Pirates players
Chicago Cubs players
Boston Braves players
Cleveland Indians players
Bloomington Bloomers players
Columbus Senators players
Hopkinsville Hoppers players
Pittsfield Hillies players
Minor league baseball managers
Baseball players from Illinois
People from Macon County, Illinois
Burials at Graceland Cemetery (Chicago)
1885 births
1960 deaths